DR. Rohana Weerasinghe (born February 18, 1949), is a Sri Lankan musician, composer and singer.

Early life
Weerasinghe was born on 18 February 1949 in Algiriya, Matara in southern Sri Lanka. He was the youngest child to his parents Henry Weerasinghe and Sepalin Weerasinghe. In 1954, Weerasinghe started schooling from Good Shepard Family Convent in Nuwara Eliya, and later moved to Vidyachakra Buddhist School Ruwan Eliya, Welimada Maha Vidyalaya, Pannipitya Dharmapala Vidyalaya and Gamini Maha Vidyalaya Nuwara Eliya.

In 1977, Weerasinghe married to Leela Beatrice De Silva, a dancing teacher in profession. They had two sons, Kalindu Gajaba and Chirath Kanishka.

His cousin daughter Priyani Jayasinghe was also a popular actress in Sri Lanka, who sang the popular hits Kandula Niwannam and Sundara Hadakata. She was killed at the age of 51 by her husband using a pair of scissors on 18 July 2018.

Music
Weerasinghe learnt the basics of music from K.V.S Perera Kithsiri Aluthge. He was able to enter the Government Music School of Sri Lanka for further studies in Oriental Music by mastering Sitar. Later he joined maestro Premasiri Khemadasa as a Sitar player in his Orchestra. Weerasinghe became a key Sitar player for music concerts of prominent Singers in Sri Lanka such as Victor Ratnayake's Sa, Nanda Malini's Shrawana Aradhana and Sanath Nandasiri's Swarna Kundala.

Weerasinghe taught music in D. S. Senanayake College, Senananda Maha Vidyalaya Meepilimanna and Ananda Sastralaya, Kotte as a government music teacher. In 1982, he joined "Sing Lanka" studios as a Sound Engineer. At that time, he composed T. M. Jayaratne's  Ekasitha dethanaka, Hiruta Horen and Neela Wickramasinghe's Punchi Sithe Punchi Sina which became popular songs in Sri Lanka.

So far he has created melodies for over 8000 songs, which includes films, teledramas, stage plays.

Weerasinghe has been the Advisor to the President of Sri Lanka in Cultural and Aesthetic Affairs since 2006.

Notable performances
 Live performances of Ransara Dahara at Arts Centre Melbourne in 2004
 Rohana Ransara performed at Sydney Opera House in 2006
 Live performance at Millennium Dome, London in 2008

Awards

Publications
 Lankika Sangeethayei Rohana Lakuna – Rohana Icon in Sri Lankan Music, Edited by Ravi Siriwardhana and Samudhra Wettasinghe, 2002
 Gaman Magak – Along a Winding Path, Biography of Rohana Weerasinghe, 2009

References

External links
"ප්‍රේමය නම්" මටත් ඕන වුණේ වෙනස් වෙන්නයි
සරසවිය සම්මානයෙන් ඇරැඹි රෝහණ වීරසිංහ
Rohana Weerasinghe Songs List
රෝහණ වීරසිංහගේ “සුදු මුතු රළ” බ්ලුරේ ගී තැටිය

1949 births
Living people
Sinhalese musicians
Sri Lankan Buddhists
Alumni of Dharmapala Vidyalaya
Kala Keerthi